The 1971 Florida Gators football team represented the University of Florida during the 1971 NCAA University Division football season. The season was Doug Dickey's second as the head coach of the Florida Gators football team.  Dickey's 1971 Florida Gators finished with a 4–7 overall record and a 1–6 record in the Southeastern Conference (SEC), tying for eighth among ten SEC teams.

Schedule

Primary source: 2015 Florida Gators Football Media Guide

Attendance figures: 1972 University of Florida Football Brochure.

Personnel

Game summaries

Duke

Mississippi State

Alabama

Sources:

Against the Gators, Alabama's Johnny Musso scored four rushing touchdowns en route to a 38–0 shutout at Florida Field. After Bill Davis gave the Crimson Tide a 3–0 lead with his first quarter field goal, Musso scored Alabama's next four touchdowns and extended their lead to 31–0. All four came on the ground with a pair from one-yard out, a three-yard run and a five-yard run. Alabama then closed the game with an 11-yard Billy Sexton touchdown pass to Dexter Wood that made the final score 38–0.

The four touchdowns scored by Musso on the ground set a new school record for rushing touchdowns. Additionally, the shutout was the first for the Crimson Tide defense since their 17–0 victory in 1967 over South Carolina.

Tennessee

LSU

Florida State

Maryland

Auburn

Georgia

Kentucky

Miami (FL)

The disappointing season ended on a controversial note. With the Gators leading the Miami Hurricanes 45–8 late in the fourth quarter of the last game of the season, senior quarterback John Reaves was just 14 yards short of the NCAA career record for passing yardage, but Miami had the ball and seemed destined to run out the clock. At the urging of Florida defensive captain Harvin Clark, Dickey agreed to permit the Gators defense to allow the Hurricanes to score, thus returning the ball to the Gators offense and giving Reaves a chance to break the record.  Dubbed the "Florida Flop" or "Gator Flop", the move worked. When Miami snapped the ball from the Florida 8-yard line, the Gators instantly flopped to the turf, allowing Miami quarterback John Hornibrook to walk uncontested into the endzone. Florida's offense got one more possession, and Reeves promptly broke the record with a pass to favorite target Carlos Alvarez. After the game, many Gator players celebrated by jumping into the pool at the Orange Bowl's east end zone used by the Miami Dolphins' live mascot, Flipper.

Miami coach Fran Curci was so angered by the turn of events that he refused to shake Dickey's hand. In a post-game interview, he called the actions "bush league" and declared that "what Doug Dickey did shows absolutely no class."

References

Florida
Florida Gators football seasons
Florida Gators football